Don't Look Any Further is the debut solo album by American R&B singer Dennis Edwards, former lead singer of the Temptations. The album was released in 1984 through Gordy Records.

Background
Edwards first made a solo recording in 1977, but had nothing to show for it but an unreleased album. He returned for the sessions of The Temptation's album Back to Basics, but then again left in the middle of the sessions.

Commercial performance
The album reached No. 2 on the R&B charts. The album was launched with the hit single "Don't Look Any Further," a duet with Siedah Garrett. Though Edwards never had another big solo hit, “Don’t Look Any Further” created its own legacy, partly due to Edwards’ and Garrett’s performances, and partly due to its iconic bassline. The bassline served as the bedrock for dozens of hip-hop, R&B, and pop tracks in the decades to follow.

It also included the radio singles "(You're My) Aphrodisiac" and "Just Like You."

Track listing

Charts

References

1984 debut albums
Albums produced by Dennis Lambert